Megan Olwen Devenish Taylor (later Mandeville, later Ellis, 25 October 1920 – 23 July 1993) was a British figure skater competitive in the 1930s. She won the World Championships in 1938 and 1939. Her father was Phil Taylor, a speed skater.

Career
Megan and fellow Brit Cecilia Colledge participated in the 1932 Winter Olympics. They were virtually the same age—Colledge was 11 years and 68 days old, and Taylor was 11 years and 102 days. They are the youngest ever female competitors in any Olympic sport and the youngest ever competitors at the Winter Olympics. Taylor finished seventh, with Colledge following in eighth in the singles competition. Sonja Henie, the dominant figure in women’s figure skating at the time, won her second Olympic gold medal here.

Taylor finished second behind Henie at the World Championships in 1934 and 1936. After Henie retired in 1936, Taylor and Colledge competed for prominence. Colledge won the Worlds in 1937, while Taylor won in 1938 and 1939. Taylor placed second behind Colledge three times at the European Championships (1937, 1938, and 1939).

After her retirement from amateur competition, Taylor toured with the Ice Capades.

Competitive highlights 

*Did not participate

Further reading
 E.R. Hall & T.D. Richardson – Champions all: camera studies by E.R. Hall (Frederick Muller, 1938)
 Richardson T.D – Modern Figure Skating (Methuen, 1938)

References

External links

European Figure Skating Championships results, 1930–1939

1920 births
1993 deaths
British female single skaters
English female single skaters
Olympic figure skaters of Great Britain
Figure skaters at the 1932 Winter Olympics
Sportspeople from Rochdale
World Figure Skating Championships medalists
European Figure Skating Championships medalists
People educated at Rathdown School